Kerry Berry Brogan is an American actress, presently based in Beijing, China. She has appeared in over 50 films and television series in a wide variety of dramatic, comedic, starring and supporting roles. A fluent Mandarin speaker who began studying the language in high school, Brogan has a bilingual website and a popular Chinese-language blog that logged 840,000 hits in just two days before the opening ceremonies of the 2008 Beijing Olympics. She is also a periodic guest and commentator on Chinese prime-time television shows.

Off screen, Brogan has played an active role in promoting East-West cultural exchange, and has received the Sino-American Friendship Award (2009) and the Goddess Artemis Award (2009). She also served as the "International Green Ambassador" for the Xi'an China International Horticultural Exposition 2011, and has been selected for a number of honorary positions including Film Ambassador for New Zealand's Film Auckland and Goodwill Ambassador for the Flying Tigers Historical Organization. In addition to her acting work, Brogan is a celebrity spokesperson for Ruyi Art Pavilion in Guangxi and Aoting Cosmetics in Beijing, and frequently hosts and emcees bilingual cultural events, concerts and product launches for Fortune 500 companies.

In 2012, Brogan established Lotus Ray Media to facilitate film and television co-productions between China, New Zealand and the United States.

Early life and education
Born to Irish-American parents from The Bronx, New York, Kerry Berry Brogan grew up in Newton, Massachusetts. She got her first acting role at the age of 11, when she was cast as Alice in a local theatre production of Alice's Adventures in Wonderland. Bitten early by the acting bug, she appeared in a number of local productions in her junior high and high school years.

When she was 16, Brogan spent several months in Beijing studying Mandarin and living with a local Chinese family as part of the Newton-Beijing Jingshan School Exchange Program. She continued her study of Chinese language and culture as an undergraduate at Bard College in Annandale, New York, where she majored in Asian Studies and appeared in operatic productions such as Pelléas et Mélisande and L'Orfeo. In her second year of college, Brogan spent a semester pursuing advanced performance studies in the Acting Department of Beijing's prestigious Central Academy of Drama. After graduating from Bard College, Brogan returned to China to pursue her acting career full-time. Fluent in Mandarin, Brogan has also studied French and German.

Acting career
Brogan has starred in over 50 films and television series, portraying a diverse range of fictional and real-life characters. Brogan has maintained a steady filming schedule, shooting on location in China and overseas, and often appearing in as many as 10 films and television programs per year.

Memorable film roles include Tricia Nixon in The Master Plan (2011), a film about Nixon's historic visit to China; American martial arts student Lucy in Shaolin Kongfu (2010); the mermaid Dada in Empires of the Deep (2010); Mary in the Chinese western/action film Unusual Love (2009); Hannah, the troubled, drug-addicted daughter of an American businessman in the dark comedy Gasp (2009 film), and journalist Helen Foster Snow in Heart to Heart, a 2008 feature film produced by August 1 Studios.

Notable television roles include Sister Eileen, a French nurse caught up in the Chinese Civil War in The Good Hero (2011); Helen, the wife of an American pilot in the Flying-Tigers-themed series The Great Rescue (2010); secret agent Laney Pierce in Wilting of a Wildflower (2007); Russian Princess Sophia in the Huayi Brothers-produced Qing Dynasty comedy Royal Tramp (2006-7); and Emma, an American orphan raised by a Chinese family in Storm on the River Song (2007).

Honors and awards
Brogan has been involved with a number of organizations dedicated to cross-cultural understanding, and has been recognized for her contributions to promoting East-West friendship. A 2008 front-page, feature article in the Boston Globe praised Brogan for her role as a "Sino-American cultural ambassador." In June 2009, Brogan was awarded the Goddess Artemis Award from the Greek Ministry of Culture and the Euro-American Women's Council (EAWC) for her contributions to international exchange and promoting the role of women in the international market. In October 2009, Brogan became the youngest recipient of the Sino-American Friendship Award, given by the U.S.-China Foundation (USCF).

Brogan also holds a number of honorary ambassador titles. In 2010, she was appointed Film Ambassador by Film Auckland, an industry-led organization that markets Auckland as a film production and post-production locale and provides on-the-ground services for international film and television producers. In 2011, the Flying Tigers Historical Organization (FTHO) named Brogan as their Goodwill Ambassador for her assistance in supporting and promoting the Flying Tigers Heritage Park and Museum in Guilin, China.  As "International Green Ambassador" for the 2011 International Horticultural Exposition in Xi'an, China, Brogan promoted eco-awareness among college students through a university-outreach program sponsored by the Expo, and helped to launch an environmentally-themed drawing contest for Chinese and international schoolchildren.

Spokesperson and endorsement work
Since 2009, Brogan has been an image spokesperson for Aoting, a Beijing-based company active in promoting women's health, beauty and lifestyle products and programs. Announcing the choice of Brogan as their celebrity spokesperson, the Chairwoman of Aoting, Yu Xiaoyan, said: "As a leading figure in the global entertainment community, Kerry is the ideal person to represent Aoting's high international standards, improve our brand recognition and raise our profile worldwide." Brogan is also a cultural ambassador for Ruyi Arts Pavilion, a Guangxi-based company that produces hand-carved wooden sculptures and bloodstone statuary based on historical Buddhist figures and themes in classical Chinese literature.

In addition to her work as a spokesperson, Brogan is also a frequent host and emcee for bilingual events, concerts and product launches for Fortune 500 companies including Hewlett Packard, Volkswagen and Volvo.

Film production and co-production
In 2012, Brogan established Lotus Ray Media to facilitate film and television co-productions between China, New Zealand and the United States.

Filmography
(All films produced and filmed in China unless otherwise noted.)

Television
(All television shows produced and filmed in China unless otherwise notes. All series are 20-40 episode miniseries except for "Rediscovering China," a documentary series.)

Stage
(All theatre performed in the United States unless otherwise noted.)

References

External links
Kerry Brogan's website
 

Year of birth missing (living people)
Living people
American expatriates in China
American film actresses
American television actresses
Actors from Newton, Massachusetts
21st-century American women